ZGF may refer to:

ZGF, the IATA code for Grand Forks Airport, British Columbia, Canada.
ZGF Architects, an American architectural firm